The 1976 Rothmans Sun-7 Series was a motor racing competition open to Touring Cars of under 3 litre capacity. It was contested at the Amaroo Park circuit in New South Wales, Australia and was the sixth annual Touring Car series to be staged at that circuit. 
It was won by Allan Grice driving a Mazda RX-3.

Schedule
The series was contested over four rounds with preliminary heats and a 50 lap final at each round.

Series results

References

Further reading
 Driver wins first title, The Sydney Morning Herald, Monday, 16 August 1976, page 13

Rothmans Sun 7 Series
Amaroo Park Touring Car Series